The siege of Takabaru occurred in October 1576 when the forces of Shimazu Yoshihisa besieged and took the fortress of Takabaru, which belonged to the Itō clan. 

The Shimazu family had by the 1570s started its rise as the dominant power in Kyūshū and continued its expansion in Hyūga Province at the expense of Itō clan.

References 

Battles of the Sengoku period
1576 in Japan
Shimazu clan
Takabaru
Conflicts in 1576